WLYV (1290 AM) is a radio station broadcasting a news/talk/sports format. Licensed to Bellaire, Ohio, United States, it serves the Wheeling area. The station is currently owned by Cody Barack, through licensee Ohio Midland Newsgroup, LLC.

Originally known as WTRF, the station signed on the air for the first time in 1947 on both the AM and FM bands. Fittingly, the call sign stood for "Two Radio Frequencies." It became WTRX in 1955 and then WOMP in 1959.

On June 5, 2017, WOMP changed their format from sports to classic country, branded as "Lejends 100.1/1290" (simulcast on FM translator W261DH 100.1 FM Wheeling, West Virginia). The station changed its call sign to WLEJ on June 12, 2017. The station changed its call sign and branding again on September 8, 2017, to WYLY, "Willie 100.1/1290". When the WLIE call letters became available, WYLY used them and changed to WLIE on January 1, 2019.

On October 31, 2021, Forever Media consummated the sale of WLIE, three sister stations, and a translator to Ohio Midland Newsgroup, LLC for $365,000. On November 15, 2021, WLIE changed its format from classic country to a simulcast of talk/sports-formatted WEIR 1430 AM Weirton, West Virginia, branded as "River Talk".. It changed its callsign to WLYV on November 23, 2021 with its own live and local content.

References

External links

FCC History Cards for WLIE

LYV
Radio stations established in 1947
1947 establishments in Ohio
News and talk radio stations in the United States